Bahman Pestonji Wadia or Bomanji Pestonji Wadia (BP Wadia, B.P. Wadia or BPW) (* 8 October 1881 in Mumbai, India; † 20 August 1958 in Bangalore, India) was an Indian theosophist and labour activist. He was first a member of the Theosophical Society Adyar (TS Adyar), later of 
the United Lodge of Theosophists (ULT). On 13 April 1918, along with V. Kalyanasundaram Mudaliar, Wadia founded the Madras Labour Union, one of India's first organised labour unions.

In 1903 he joined the Theosophical Society in Mumbai and moved to Adyar in 1908. He worked for the journal The Theosophist. He became president of the Madras Textile Workers' Union and engaged himself for worker's rights.

In 1919 he visited the ULT in Los Angeles and was very impressed. When he returned to Adyar in 1919, he tried to work for a change of direction in the TS Adyar, based on the ideals of the ULT, but didn't succeed. He became disappointed and left the TS Adyar to work for the ULT in Los Angeles.

In 1923 he founded several lodges on the east coast of the States. In 1925 he founded a lodge in the UK. In 1928 a lodge was founded in France, in 1929 in Mumbai, and in 1930 he began publishing the journal The Aryan Path.
In 1928 he married Sophia Camacho (1901-1986). In 1945 he founded The Indian Institute of World Culture (IIWC) in Bangalore. Other lodges of the ULT were founded in the States, Europe and India.

A street in Bangalore, B.P. Wadia Road, is named after him.

Notes

Works
 Growth through service. The Theosophical association of New York, New York 1922
 Problems of national and international politics. Theosophical association of New York, New York 1922
 Studies in "The secret doctrine“. Theosophy Co. (India), Bombay 1963
 The building of the home. Indian Institute of World Culture, Bangalore 1959
 The inner ruler. Theosophical association of New York, New York 1922
 Theosophy and new thought. The Cosmopolitan press, Bombay 1907
 Thus have I heard, leading articles from "The Aryan path“. Indian Institute of World Culture, Bangalore 1959

External links
 
 Biography and texts
 Biography in seven parts
 United Lodge of Theosophists India
 Biography on 50th death anniversary

Wadia, Bahman Pestonji
Wadia, Bahman Pestonji
Trade unionists from Maharashtra
1881 births
1958 deaths
Politicians from Mumbai
20th-century Indian politicians
Wadia family